Bible translations into Dutch have a history that goes back to the Middle Ages. The oldest extant Bible translations into the Dutch language date from the Middle Dutch (Diets) period.

Abbreviations 
Bible translations are commonly referred to by their abbreviations, such as Psalm 55:22 (NBV), in which "NBV" stands for Nieuwe Bijbelvertaling ("New Bible Translation", 2004). The table below gives an overview of commonly used translations abbreviations:

History

Oldest partial translations 
Several partial translations of the Bible into Old Dutch and Middle Dutch have been handed down in manuscripts. All these Medieval translations were made from Latin, usually the Latin Vulgate, the official version employed by the Catholic Church. After the early Medieval Christianisation of the language area of Old Dutch (Old Low Franconian), the entire populace was nominally Catholic, but very few were literate, let alone in Latin.

The Wachtendonck Psalms could be considered the oldest known biblical fragments in 'Dutch'. Although found in Munsterbilzen Abbey by Flemish humanist Justus Lipsius in the late 16th century, these texts most likely originated in the Dutch–German borderlands between the Meuse and Rhine rivers in the 9th or 10th century. Although the texts' language is Old Dutch, Psalms 1 to 3 show clear Central Franconian characteristics. It is generally assumed that the texts as handed down are an Old Dutch redaction of a Central Franconian original. Another contender is the Rhinelandic Rhyming Bible, a series of fragments of biblical histories translations into an apparent mix of Old High German, Old Saxon, and Old Dutch from the early 12th century. However, due to the paucity of evidence, it's difficult to date, linguistically classify and geographically pinpoint the origins of these writings; although a number of scholars associate it with the German Rhineland, possibly the Werden Abbey, this remains undetermined.

This text is only attested in four 14th-century manuscripts, but probably dates from around 1200. C.C. de Bruin (1935) concluded that it was an example of a very poor translation of the four canonical gospels from the Latin Vulgate: he thought that the author likely neither mastered Latin nor his own native tongue in writing. Later scholars developed more nuanced positions; this gospel translation might just have been a tool for Latin-knowing clerics to explain to their congregations the texts' meaning in the vernacular. It was not meant to be read by or in front of the general public, as the liturgical language was Latin.

Advanced and first printed translations 

A later example is the Rijmbijbel of Jacob van Maerlant (1271), a poetic edition of the Petrus Comestor's Historia scholastica (c. 1173). It was not a literal translation, but a so-called "history Bible": a freely translated compilation of texts from the "historical books" of the Bible mixed with extrabiblical sources and traditions. Another example is the Liégeois Leven van Jesus ("Life of Jesus"), a gospel harmony based on Tatian's Latin Diatessaron.

Several Middle Dutch translations of the Apocalypse of John, the Psalms, the Epistles and the Gospels appeared in Flanders and Brabant at the end of the 13th and the beginning of the 14th century. Later, the entourage of Brabantian mystic John of Ruusbroec (1293–1381) produced a full translation of all non-historical books of the New Testament. Evidence suggests that such late Medieval Dutch translations were in widespread use in the Low Countries and the German Rhineland amongst monks, nuns and wealthy burghers.

It was probably made at the Carthusian monastery in Herne, Belgium, in the second half of the fourteenth century, probably in 1360. Scholars refer to the anonymous author as the ""; some identify Petrus Naghel as the translator, but others are not convinced. Around 1390, an anonymous "" also emerged: the oldest surviving manuscript from 1391 had no gospels, but a 1399 manuscript contains the entire New Testament. Scholars find it highly probable that it was written by the Windesheim monk Johan Scutken (died 1423). 

The Hernse Bijbel served as a template for the oldest print translation of Biblical books into the Middle Dutch language: the Delft Bible (Delftse Bijbel), printed in Delft in 1477. This translation from the Latin Vulgate only included the Old Testament with Apocrypha but without the Psalms. Because the latter two satisfied the needs of most vernacular readers – primarily nuns in convents – no full Dutch Bible translation was ever printed before the Reformation.

Reformation era translations 

During the sixteenth century the Liesveltbijbel (first ed. 1526, Antwerp, many later editions), Biestkensbijbel (1560) and the Deux-Aesbijbel (1562, Emden) were produced. These editions were all Protestant and therefore unauthorised, as a result their availability would have been poor at times. An authorised Catholic translation based on the Latin Vulgate to counter the Textus Receptus favoured by Protestants was also produced, the Leuvense Bijbel (1548, Louvain). These were the oldest print translations of the entire Bible into Dutch. The Vorstermanbijbel (Antwerp, 1528 several later editions) was a semi-authorised version with a mix of Latin Vulgate and Textus Receptus translations that is difficult to classify as either 'Catholic' or 'Protestant'; later editions generally removed Reformationist passages and followed the Vulgate ever more closely, aligning it more with Catholicism.

Philips of Marnix, Lord of Saint-Aldegonde (1538–1598), who was among the leaders of the Dutch Revolt, and Pieter Datheen were tasked in 1578 by the second national dynod of the Reformed church in Dort to produce a translation into Dutch, although this did not result in a translation. Philips of Marnix was again asked to translate the Bible in 1594 and 1596, but he was unable to finish this work before he died in 1598. His translation influenced the later Statenvertaling or Statenbijbel.

The first authorised Bible translation into Dutch directly from Greek (using the Textus Receptus) and Hebrew sources was the Statenvertaling. It was ordered by the States-General of the emerging Dutch Republic at the Synod of Dort in 1618/19, and first published in 1637. It soon became the generally accepted translation for the Calvinist Reformed Churches in the Northern Netherlands and remained so well into the 20th century.

Lutherans in the Dutch Republic employed the Biestkensbijbel since 1560, but there was a need for a proper Dutch translation of the Luther Bible (written in High German) to preserve their identity vis-à-vis the Statenvertaling that was deemed too Calvinist, and to provide immigrated Lutheran Germans with an appropriate Dutch translation. To this end, a translation commission was set up in 1644 headed by the Lutheran preacher Adolph Visscher (1605–1652), resulting in the Lutheran translation of 1648. Although the preface claimed it was a new translation, this was in fact not the case. Nevertheless, this version became so well-known amongst Dutch Lutherans and the later Evangelical Lutheran Church in the Kingdom of the Netherlands (1818–2004) as an exceptional translation associated with the commission's president that it became known as the "".

Modern translations 

In order to replace the outdated Statenvertaling with a more accurate, modern, critical edition that was acceptable to all Protestant churches in the Netherlands, the Nederlands Bijbelgenootschap (NBG, "Dutch Bible Society") set up two commissions with experts and representatives from most denominations to produce the NBG 1951, which would grow to become the new Protestant standard for the second half of the 20th century. Most Calvinist and Lutheran congregations adopted it. Only a minority of conservative Calvinist churches rejected it, favouring the old Statenvertaling instead. Catholics developed their own alternative, the Willibrordvertaling (1961–1978, authorised by the Catholic Church); the 1995 second edition was never authorised by the Catholic Church, but a special edition of it with a 'Protestant' ordering of chapters was adopted by a few Protestant churches. Some other examples of modern Dutch language translations are Groot Nieuws Bijbel (GNB, 1996), and the International Bible Society's Het Boek (1987). 

In 2004, the Nieuwe Bijbelvertaling (NBV) translation appeared, which was produced by an ecumenical translation team, and is intended as an all-purpose translation for pulpit and home use. It is a critical, Alexandrian text-type version, based on the 27th Nestle–Aland edition of 2001. However, some theologians levelled criticism on its accuracy. Around the same time, there has also been much work on very literal, idiolect translations, such as the Naarden translation of 2004, Albert Koster's translation of the Old Testament, a work in progress since 1991, and the Torah translation of the Societas Hebraica Amstelodamensis. In December 2010, the Herziene Statenvertaling ("Revised States Translation") was released. It essentially replicates the Statenvertaling of 1637 into modern Dutch, and was produced by conservative Protestants who maintained that the Byzantine Textus Receptus was superior to the Alexandrian text-type that modern scholars used for critical editions, such as the 2004 Nieuwe Bijbelvertaling.

In October 2014, the Bijbel in Gewone Taal ("Bible in Normal Language") was released.

Comparison

References

External links

 De Delfste Bijbel, the first Dutch Bible (1477)
 Another site with the same
 De Leuvense Bijbel, the second Dutch Bible (1548)
 Statenvertaling: full text, including the Apocrypha; 1977 edition
 UBS Biblija.net/BijbelOnline Bijbel Online: full text of Statenvertaling (Jongbloed-editie and 1977 edition), Nederlands Bijbelgenootschap, Groot Nieuws Bijbel, Willibrordvertaling, and De Nieuwe Bijbelvertaling
 BasisBijbel online
 
 Entry in Dutch Wikipedia

 
History of Calvinism in the Netherlands